Gamers is the second album released by The Conscious Daughters.  It was released on March 5, 1996 for Scarface Records, distributed by Priority Records and featured production by Paris, Tone Capone, Studio Ton and Mike Mosley.  Gamers only made it to one Billboard chart, it made it to 29 on the Top R&B/Hip-Hop Albums chart.  One single charted, entitled "Gamers".

Track listing
"Strikin'" (K. Smith, C. Green)- 4:21
"Gamers" (K. Smith, C. Green)- 4:32
"You Want Me" (K. Smith, C. Green)- 3:03
"All Caught Up" (K. Smith, C. Green, O. Jackson)- 3:48
"She's So Tight" (K. Smith, C. Green)- 4:19
"It Don't Stop" (Featuring Suga T) (K. Smith, C. Green, F. Morales, M. Ludlum, T. Stevens)- 5:17 
"Female Vocalism" (K. Smith, C. Green, E. Brooks)- 4:11
"Da Mack Hit" (K. Smith, C. Green, O. Jackson)- 3:31
"Who Got Da Mic" (K. Smith, C. Green)- 4:18
"TCD Fo' Life (West Coast Bomb)" (K. Smith, C. Green, O. Jackson)- 3:35
"Come Smooth, Come Rude" (K. Smith, C. Green, O. Jackson)- 4:10
"Widow" (K. Smith, C. Green, O. Jackson)- 4:06
"So Good" (K. Smith, C. Green)- 4:51
"All Star Freestyle" (Featuring Mac Mall, Money-B, Saafir, C-Funk, Mystic, Clee, Father Dom, Harm)- 7:12

Samples
 "It Don't Stop" contains samples of "Stay A Little While Child", as performed by Loose Ends and "One Nation Under a Groove" by Funkadelic.
 "Come Smooth, Come Rude" contains a sample of "I'm Afraid the Masquerade Is Over" by David Porter.
 "Who Got Da Mic" contains a sample of "You Are What I'm All About" by The New Birth.

Personnel
 Keyboards: Nate Fox, Mike Mosley, Sam Bostic, Paris, Studio Ton, Tone Capone, Erik "The Hawk" Hawkins
 Drum programming: Nate Fox, Mike Mosley, Sam Bostic, Paris, Studio Ton, Tone Capone
 Bass guitar: Petey Boyd on "Strikin'", Gary Bolden on "Who Got Da Mic"
 Scratches: DJ Yonie Yon on "She's So Tight"
 Background vocals: Nate Fox on "Strikin'", Harm on "Gamers", Rose on "Female Vocalism", Mystic on "Who Got Da Mic" and "TCD Fo' Life (West Coast Bomb)", Sandy Griffith on "Come Smooth, Come Rude", Luenell on "N.F.L." and "Daddy's Home" skits
 Recording engineer: Eric Valentine, Michael Denten, Benjamin Grant DePauw
 Mixing engineer: Eric Valentine
 Photography: Marcus Hanschen
 Art Direction, layout and graphics: Todd D. Smith

Charts

References

1996 albums
The Conscious Daughters albums
Albums produced by Studio Ton